Parker Croft (born January 13, 1987) is an American actor and screenwriter, most famous for his role as Felix on Once Upon a Time.

Early life 
Parker Croft was born in Burlington, Vermont and raised in Northern Vermont. His mother, Juliet McVicker, is a jazz singer; his father, Parker Hendrick Croft Jr., is an architect, and a painter.  Children's theater was Parker’s introduction to acting in 1994, at the age of seven. Soon after, he began working with the Vermont Stage Company.

Parker's schooling was varied. He attended public and private schools, as well as experimenting with home schooling. Prior to his graduation from the White Mountain School, Parker received a scholarship to the Perry Mansfield School for the Performing Arts, a summer school for aspiring teen actors. This led him to New York City, where he completed study at the Stella Adler Studio, the William Esper Studio, and the Hubert Berghof Studio.

Career 
Parker Croft made his film debut as John in the teen movie, Hooking Up with co-stars Corey Feldman and Bronson Pinchot. One year later he appeared as the gay bashing bully Cooper in Were the World Mine (2008), an independent musical film, based on A Midsummer Night's Dream, in which he sang for the soundtrack.

Parker's television debut was on the FX show Nip/Tuck as Enigma. From his performance in Nip/Tuck Parker was offered a role in Nuclear Family (2010) alongside Ray Wise and Corin Nemec.

Parker’s television credits include the FX pilot Back Nine (Creator Jason Filardi), the NBC pilot 1600 Penn, and the Gigapix pilot Adult Life (Creator Conrad Jackson)

In addition to acting, Parker is also a writer. In 2010 he co-wrote Falling Overnight in collaboration with partners Aaron Golden, and Conrad Jackson as a vehicle for his first leading role.

Personal life 
Parker lives in Los Angeles.

As of June 2016, he is married to Elisa Croft.

Filmography

Film

Television

References

External links
 
 

1987 births
Living people
American male film actors
American male screenwriters
Writers from Burlington, Vermont
Male actors from Vermont
21st-century American male actors
Screenwriters from Vermont
21st-century American screenwriters
21st-century American male writers